The 2007 Sigerson Cup was the 97th staging of the Sigerson Cup since its establishment by the Gaelic Athletic Association in 1911.

The Sigerson Cup is the top division of university football in Ireland. It is administrated by the Higher Education committee which is part of the Gaelic Athletic Association.

The 2007 Sigerson Cup winners were Queen's University Belfast, who defeated UUJ in the final 0-15 to 0-14.

Winning caption: Daniel McCartan
Winning manager: James McCartan Jr.

Summary
In the quarter-finals were UCD, Sligo IT, and Jordanstown beat the 2006 Sigerson Cup champions DCU to gain a place in the last eight. Other teams include NUI Galway, Cork IT, Maynooth, and Queen's.

Bracket

See also
British University Gaelic football Championship
British University Hurling Championship

References

External links
Official results

Sigerson Cup
Sigerson Cup
February 2007 sports events in Europe
March 2007 sports events in Europe